Pohlmann is a surname. Notable people with the surname include:

Alexander Pohlmann (1865–1952), German politician
Anthony Pohlmann, German officer who achieved prominence serving the Maratha Empire, notably leading against Wellesley at the 1803 Battle of Assaye, but later returned to Company service
Dirk Pohlmann, German journalist
Eric Pohlmann, Austrian actor and voice actor
Ingo Pohlmann, German musician and song writer
Hermann Pohlmann, German aerospace engineer

See also 
Harry C. Pohlman Field, baseball field located in Beloit, Wisconsin,
Robert von Pöhlmann, German ancient historian
Eric Poehlman, American discredited academic
Marcus Pohlmann,  American political scientist

Ethnonymic surnames
de:Pohlmann